Maiden's Rock (Bulgarian: Momina skala) is a 1922 Bulgarian silent drama film directed by Boris Grezov and starring Grezov, Katya Syoyanova and Vyara Salplieva-Staneva.

Cast
 Boris Grezov as Stoyan 
 Katya Syoyanova as Lilyana  
 Vyara Salplieva-Staneva as Gyula  
 Mihail Goretzki as Bozhichko, selski kmet  
 Dimitar Stoyanov as Trichko 
 Yordan Minkov as Doychin, bashtata na Trichko  
 Dimitar Keranov as Mladen, priyatel na Stoyan  
 Ivan Stanev as Asen. mlad tziganin  
 Cherneva as Adzhara, stara tziganka 
 Petko Chirpanliev as Hyusein, Tziganski stareyshina

References

Bibliography 
 Marcel Cornis-Pope & John Neubauer. History of the Literary Cultures of East-Central Europe: Junctures and disjunctures in the 19th and 20th centuries. Volume IV: Types and stereotypes. John Benjamins Publishing, 2010.

External links 
 

1922 films
1922 drama films
Bulgarian silent films
Bulgarian drama films
Bulgarian-language films
Films directed by Boris Grezov
Bulgarian black-and-white films
Silent drama films